Bruce Kaphan is a musician who has worked on many studio projects, often as a pedal steel player, from 1970 to 2011.  In particular he was a member of American Music Club.

Albums
Albums he has worked on include the following:
 Schoolyard Ghosts
 Everclear
 I Am the Resurrection
 California
 Silence
 Pass It Around
 Violence in the Snowy Fields
 Mercury
 Wildflower
 United Kingdom
 San Francisco
 West
 No Alternative
 Three Snakes and One Charm (album)The Black Crowes

References

External links

Pedal steel guitarists
Year of birth missing (living people)
Living people
Place of birth missing (living people)
American Music Club members